The canton of Boulogne-Billancourt-2 is an administrative division of the Hauts-de-Seine department, in northern France. It was created at the French canton reorganisation which came into effect in March 2015. Its seat is in Boulogne-Billancourt.

It consists of the following communes:
Boulogne-Billancourt (partly)
Sèvres

References

Cantons of Hauts-de-Seine